George Thomas Dickie (12 August 1926 – March 24, 2020) was an American philosopher. He was a Professor Emeritus of Philosophy at University of Illinois at Chicago. His specialities included aesthetics, philosophy of art, and Eighteenth Century theories of taste.

Education and career 
He received a BA from Florida State University in 1949 and a PhD from the University of California, Los Angeles in 1959. He was a Guggenheim Fellow in 1978.

He served as President of the Illinois Philosophy Association (1990–91) and President of the American Society for Aesthetics (1993–94).

Work 
He was an influential philosopher of art working in the analytical tradition. His institutional theory of art inspired both supporters who produced variations on the theory as well as detractors.

One of his more influential works is The Century of Taste (1996), an inquiry into several eighteenth-century philosophers' treatments of the subject.  The bulk of the work is devoted to championing David Hume's treatment of the subject over that of Immanuel Kant. A review of the work can be found in The Philosophical Review, 107:3 (July, 1998).

Books 
 Aesthetics: An Introduction (Pegasus, 1971)
 Art and the Aesthetic: An Institutional Analysis (Cornell University Press, 1974)
 The Art Circle (Haven Publications, 1984)
 Evaluating Art (Temple University Press, 1988)
 The Century of Taste (Oxford University Press, 1996)
 Introduction to Aesthetics: An Analytic Approach (Oxford University Press, 1997)
 Art and Value (Blackwell, 2001)

References

External links 
 

1926 births
2020 deaths
20th-century American essayists
20th-century American male writers
20th-century American philosophers
21st-century American essayists
21st-century American male writers
21st-century American philosophers
American art critics
American male essayists
American male non-fiction writers
American philosophy academics
Analytic philosophers
Florida State University alumni
Hume scholars
Kant scholars
People from Palmetto, Florida
Philosophers of art
Philosophers of culture
Philosophers of history
Philosophy writers
Trope theorists
University of California, Los Angeles alumni
University of Illinois Chicago faculty